Parathyas is a genus of mites belonging to the family Hydryphantidae.

The species of this genus are found in Europe and Northern America.

Species:
 Parathyas barbigera (Viets, 1908) 
 Parathyas bruzelii (Lundblad, 1926)

References

Trombidiformes
Trombidiformes genera